Rainbow Ridge is a small ridge which forms a distinct western rim to the large crater-like depression high in the central part of Brown Peninsula, in Victoria Land in Antarctica. Given this geologically descriptive name by the New Zealand Antarctic Place-Names Committee (NZ-APC), it arose from investigations by the New Zealand Geological Survey and the Victoria University Expedition in 1964–65. The top of the ridge has been planed off by subsequent glaciation and the resultant surface exposes two basalt "pipes" (Nubian Formation) within the trachyte. These have altered the trachyte at their margins to various shades of brown, hence the name of the ridge.

Ridges of Victoria Land
Scott Coast